Mommywood is a 2009 book by Tori Spelling, released on April 14, 2009.

Synopsis
Actress Tori Spelling follows up her bestselling Stori Telling with another revealing and entertaining look at her life in the spotlight. In Mommywood, Spelling describes her adventures rearing her two small children in the Hollywood Hills.

2009 non-fiction books